Dondang Sayang literally love ballad, originated in Malacca sometime in the 15th century, influenced by traditional Portuguese folk music. It is a traditional Malay form of entertainment where Baba and Nyonya singers exchange extemporaneous Malay Pantun (poetry), in a lighthearted and sometimes humorous style. The singers are normally accompanied by a violin, two Malay rebana (drums), and a tetawak (gong). These instruments are often supplemented by other available instruments, most notably, accordions, flutes, or an additional violin.

The chief musician is usually the violinist who plays a primary role in dondang sayang, providing a counter melody to the vocal melody. Musicians may switch instruments in between performances, but the violinist seldom does, although this is permitted. If there are musicians to spare, up to 5 rebana may be used. Sometimes, the rebana may be substituted by the tambour and barrel drum or even the kompang. The music is slow, and a song usually consists of 32 bars, beginning with a violin introduction, with the rebana and then the gong entering, and the voice finally entering in bar 5. Its style is somewhat informal and its lyrics usually consist of love poems. (Ahmad Usop 1984). The musical instruments may also be augmented with an accordion (Shafiee Ahmad 1992).

It is also associated with the Ronggeng dance.

See also
Music of Malaysia
Mata-kantiga

References

External links
Sarkissian, Margaret. Kantiga di Padri sa chang. From the collection "Viagem dos Sons", Tradisom, Vila Verde, Portugal, 1998
Silva Rego, Padre António da. "Apontamentos para o estudo do dialecto português de Malaca". Boletim Geral das Colônias, Lisboa, Portugal, 1941.
 Musical Malaysia/SYNCRETIC SONG BASED FORMS: Dondang Sayang
PUBLICATIONS RELATED TO MALAYSIAN MUSIC (TDC Malaysia 1996)

Malay culture
Malaysian styles of music